Frederick R. Ming was a Republican politician from Michigan who served in both houses of the Michigan Legislature, including as Speaker of the House during the 55th and 56th Legislatures. Ming was also a candidate in the primary for Lieutenant Governor of Michigan in 1934, losing to Thomas Read who was eventually elected with Governor Frank Fitzgerald.

Ming's parents, Henry and Mary, were born in Germany and came to the United States in 1859, settling in Oswego, New York. Ming became an orphan at the age of 13, after his father's death in 1877, and worked as a farm hand an in a cheese factory in New York. He moved to Cheboygan in July 1880 where he worked in a sawmill and later became a teacher. Ming also attended the Ontario Veterinary College and followed his late father into that profession.

References

1865 births
1943 deaths
Speakers of the Michigan House of Representatives
Republican Party Michigan state senators
Michigan sheriffs
Republican Party members of the Michigan House of Representatives
American people of German descent
Politicians from Rochester, New York
People from Cheboygan, Michigan
Politicians from Oswego, New York